Auenland Südholstein is an Amt ("collective municipality") in the district of Segeberg, in Schleswig-Holstein, Germany. Its seat is in Nützen. Before 1 April 2022, the name of the Amt was Kaltenkirchen-Land, and its seat was in the town Kaltenkirchen.

The Amt Auenland Südholstein consists of the following municipalities:

Alveslohe 
Hartenholm 
Hasenmoor 
Lentföhrden 
Nützen 
Schmalfeld

References

Ämter in Schleswig-Holstein
Segeberg